Saravuth Parthipakoranchai (born 10 April 1950) is a Thai former footballer who competed in the 1968 Summer Olympics.

References

External links
 

1950 births
Living people
Saravuth Parthipakoranchai
Saravuth Parthipakoranchai
Footballers at the 1968 Summer Olympics
1972 AFC Asian Cup players
Southeast Asian Games medalists in football
Saravuth Parthipakoranchai
Saravuth Parthipakoranchai
Association football goalkeepers
Competitors at the 1967 Southeast Asian Peninsular Games